This is a list of released video games for the Wii and Wii U video game consoles which allow use of the Balance Board accessory. The first game to support this accessory is Wii Fit.

Wii

There are  games which support the balance board.

WiiWare

Wii U

Unreleased

References

 
Wii games